Esporte Clube Pinheiros, or Pinheiros Basquete, is a Brazilian professional basketball team that is based in São Paulo, Brazil. The club's name is commonly abbreviated as E.C. Pinheiros, or E.C.P. The full name of the club is Esporte Clube Pinheiros São Paulo (E.C.P.S.P.). It is a part of the multi-sports club, Esporte Clube Pinheiros (E.C.P.) which among other sports, fields a men's professional basketball team. The club was originally known as Sport Club Germânia (S.C. Germânia). The club plays in the top-tier level Brazilian League, the NBB.

History
The club's parent athletic club, Esporte Clube Pinheiros, was founded in 1899, under the name Sport Club Germânia (S.C. Germânia). The club's name was changed to Esporte Clube Pinheiros (E.C.P), in 1941. In the 2005–06 season, E.C. Pinheiros participated for the first time in the professional first division of Brazilian basketball, but then failed to qualify for the single league that resulted from the merging of the conferences. In the 2008–09 season, Pinheiros joined the new top-tier level Brazilian league, the Novo Basquete Brasil (NBB), under the sponsored name, Pinheiros/Sky. The club finished 2nd in the FIBA South American League in 2011, and also finished 2nd in the InterLeagues Tournament in 2011 and 2012.

In 2013, the team won its first international tournament, the most important tournament of Latin America, the FIBA Americas League, with two victories against the host team, Capitanes de Arecibo, of the Puerto Rican League, and the Argentine League club CA Lanús. In the second round, Pinheiros also needed a Capitanes victory over the Brazilian League club, UniCEUB/BRB, the team that had eliminated Pinheiros in the two previous editions of the NBB. And it happened - the team from Puerto Rico, beat the defending three time Brazilian League champions, helping Pinheiros to win its first international title.

Pinheiros thus qualified to play at the 2013 edition of the FIBA Intercontinental Cup, against the defending back-to-back EuroLeague champions, Olympiacos. Pinheiros lost the series two games to none, losing the first game by a score of 81–70, and the second game by a score of 86–69.

Arenas
E.C. Pinheiros plays its home games at the Ginásio Poliesportivo Henrique Villaboim, which is located on the club's home grounds, at Jardim Europa.

Players

Current roster

Titles and honors

Worldwide
FIBA Intercontinental Cup
Runners-up (1): 2013

Latin America
FIBA Americas League
Champions (1): 2013
Runners-up (1): 2014

Continental
FIBA South American League
Runners-up (1): 2011
InterLeagues Tournament
Runners-up (2): 2011, 2012

Regional
São Paulo State Championship
Champions (1): 2011
Runners-up (2): 2010, 2012

Notable players

Head coaches
 Cláudio Mortari
 Marcel de Souza

References

External links
Official Website 
Brazilian League Team Page 
LatinBasket.com Team Page

 
Basketball in São Paulo
Novo Basquete Brasil
Basketball teams established in 1899
Basketball teams in Brazil
1899 establishments in Brazil